Lieutenant-Colonel Alexander Kenneth Stewart (30 August 1852 – 13 February 1945) was a Scotland international rugby union player who represented Scotland from 1873 to 1875.

Rugby Union career

Amateur career

Stewart played for Edinburgh University.

Provincial career

Stewart represented Edinburgh District against Glasgow District in the world's third provincial match, the 'inter-city', on 6 December 1873.

Stewart next played for the District on 24 January 1874.

International career

Stewart's international debut was the home match against England, in the fixture at The Oval on 23 February 1874.

Stewart's last match for Scotland, again against England, was the fixture at The Oval on 6 March 1876.

Medical career

Stewart passed his medical degree at Edinburgh University and entered the Indian Medical Service.

Military career

While Stewart was in India he served with the Poona Horse regiment. He was present at the siege of Kandahar in 1895 and in the Chitral Campaign that same year and took part in the Afghan War in 1897.

Family

Stewart was the head of the Achnacone branch of the Stewart clan, the 12th of his family to hold that honour. His great, great grandfather was killed at Culloden. He retired in 1897, after the Afghan War, and remained in his family home of Achnacone. He was made a Deputy Lieutenant and Justice of the Peace for the County of Argyll.

References

1852 births
1945 deaths
Scottish rugby union players
Scotland international rugby union players
Edinburgh University RFC players
Edinburgh District (rugby union) players
People from Mumbai